DSTO may refer to:

Defence Science and Technology Organisation, Australia, now Defence Science and Technology Group
Defence Science and Technology Organization, Pakistan
Dual Stage To Orbit/Double Stage To Orbit, a spacecraft in which two distinct stages provide propulsion consecutively in order to achieve orbital velocity